Loup Durand (1933-1995) was a French crime writer. He was born in Flassans-sur-Issole and studied in Marseille, Aix-en-Provence, London and New York. He worked in a variety of professions such as barman, docker, flight attendant, interpreter, and journalist.

He began his career as a professional writer at the age of forty-three. He wrote numerous thrillers, some under pseudonyms such as "H. L. Dugall" and "Michaël Borgia", the latter used with Pierre Rey.

He won several prizes for his work:
 1976 Prix du roman d'aventures for Un amour d'araignée
 1987 Prix Maison de la Presse for Daddy

Daddy was translated into English by J. Maxwell Brownjohn. It was made into a bande dessinee illustrated by Rene Follet, and a movie in 2003, featuring Klaus Maria Brandauer.

Durand also wrote scripts, e.g. for the Alain Delon thriller Dancing Machine and for the 1982 TV series The Tiger Brigades.

References

French crime fiction writers
1933 births
1995 deaths